Digger or diggers may refer to:

Excavator, heavy construction equipment consisting of a boom, dipper, bucket and cab on a rotating platform known as the "house".
Backhoe loaders and backhoes are often known as diggers or mini diggers in British parlance

Places
 Digger, Leh, a village in India

People
labourer
 Digger (nickname)
 Digger (soldier), Australian and New Zealand slang for a veteran
 Digger Indians, ethnic slur for Native Americans in California
 Digger, person who frequently submits or reads stories on Digg, a technology news website

Fictional characters
 Digger (mascot), mascot of the London Irish rugby football club

 Diggers, characters in the video game Mega Man Legends
 Digger (Marvel Comics), a comic book character owned by Marvel Comics
 Willard "Digger" Barnes, in the American television series Dallas
 Digger (NASCAR), the mascot for the NASCAR on Fox "gopher cam", from The Adventures of Digger and Friends
 Digger, a character in Kathryn Lasky's book series Guardians of Ga'Hoole
 Digger Mole, a character from Shirt Tales
 George "Digger" Harkness, the first Captain Boomerang DC Comics villain
 Digby "Digger" O'Dell, on the American radio and television shows Life of Riley and the 1949 film

Arts and entertainment

Literature
 Digger (webcomic), a webcomic by Ursula Vernon
 The Digger, a Scottish weekly magazine
 The Digger (alternative magazine), a 1970s Australian magazine
 Diggers (1990), the second book in The Nome Trilogy by Terry Pratchett

Film
 Diggers (1931 film), an Australian film directed by F. W. Thring
 Digger (1993 film), a Canadian film starring Leslie Nielsen
 Diggers (2006 film), an American film starring Paul Rudd and Lauren Ambrose
 Digger (2020 film), a Greek film

Television
 "Digger" (Bottom), a 1992 episode from the British television sitcom Bottom
 Diggers (TV series), a reality television show on the National Geographic Channel

Music
 Digger (band), a punk band
 The Diggers (band), a Scottish band

Video games
 Heiankyo Alien, a 1979 video game released as Digger in North America
 Digger (video game), a computer game from 1983
 Diggers (video game), launch title for the Amiga CD32 videogaming console
 Digger, one of the eight tools available in the video game Lemmings

Organizations
 Diggers, a group of radicals during the English Civil War
 Diggers (theater), a 1960s collective of the Haight-Ashbury area of San Francisco, US
 Bendigo Diggers, former name of Bendigo Football Club, an Australian rules football club

Other uses
 Digger wasp (disambiguation), multiple wasp families
 Digger, style of motorcycle, similar to a chopper
 A nickname for a front engine dragster
 The Diggers (Van Gogh), 1889 painting by Vincent van Gogh

See also

 Dig (disambiguation)
 Digging (disambiguation)